Calvary Episcopal Church may refer to:

In the United States
 Calvary Episcopal Church (Golden, Colorado), listed on the U.S. National Register of Historic Places (NRHP) in Colorado
 Calvary Episcopal Church (Americus, Georgia), on watchlist of the Georgia Trust for Historic Preservation
 Calvary Episcopal Church (Louisville, Kentucky), listed on the NRHP in Kentucky
 Calvary Episcopal Church (Rochester, Minnesota)
 Calvary Episcopal Church (Red Lodge, Montana), listed on the NRHP in Montana
 Calvary Episcopal Church (Summit, New Jersey)
 Calvary Episcopal Church (Burnt Hills, New York), listed on the NRHP in Saratoga County
 Calvary Episcopal Church (Manhattan), New York City, New York
 Calvary Episcopal Church (McDonough, New York), listed on the NRHP in Chenango County, New York
 Calvary Episcopal Church (Utica, New York), listed on the NRHP in Utica, New York
 Calvary Episcopal Church and Churchyard (Tarboro, North Carolina), listed on the NRHP in North Carolina
 Calvary Episcopal Church (Cincinnati), Ohio; and Sunday School Building
 Calvary Cathedral (Sioux Falls, South Dakota)
 Calvary Episcopal Church (Pittsburgh), Pennsylvania
 Calvary Episcopal Church (Memphis, Tennessee), listed on the NRHP in Tennessee

See also
 Calvary Church (disambiguation)